Michael Wayne Christopher (born November 3, 1963) is a former Major League Baseball right-handed pitcher. He is an alumnus of East Carolina University.

Drafted by the New York Yankees in the 7th round of the 1985 Major League Baseball Draft, Christopher would make his Major League Baseball debut with the Los Angeles Dodgers on September 10, 1991, and appear in his final game on May 11, 1996. One of the highlights of Christopher's career came on September 5, 1995. He pitched 4 innings of shutout baseball to hold down a 6-4 Tigers victory over the Twins and save the game for starting pitcher C.J. Nitkowski. It was the only save of Christopher's major league career.

References

External links

East Carolina University alumni
Baseball players from Virginia
1963 births
Living people
Los Angeles Dodgers players
Cleveland Indians players
Detroit Tigers players
Major League Baseball pitchers
Oneonta Yankees players
Albany-Colonie Yankees players
Fort Lauderdale Yankees players
Columbus Clippers players
Albuquerque Dukes players
Colorado Springs Sky Sox players
Charlotte Knights players
Toledo Mud Hens players
Sportspeople from Petersburg, Virginia